George Telek Mamua MBE, commonly known simply as Telek, is a musician and singer from Papua New Guinea. He has won one ARIA Award for this 1997 self-titled album. Telek sings in his native language, Kuanua, and in Tok Pisin. Many of his songs are sung in three-part harmonies that are characteristic of the Tolai.

Career

1959-1995: Early Years
Born in 1959 in Barovon village near Kokopo in East New Britain Province, Telek is one of the few Papua New Guinean singers to gain an international following. Telek sang with various bands in Papua New Guinea early in his career - most notably with the contemporary Tolai group Painim Wok where he was the lead vocalist.

In 1989, Telek met David Bridie of the Australian band Not Drowning, Waving, and they recorded the album Tabaran, which was released in 1990. At the ARIA Music Awards of 1992, the album was nominated for ARIA Award for Best Indigenous Release.

1997-2002: Talek and Serious Tam
Telek released his debut solo album, Telek in 1997. At the ARIA Music Awards of 1997, the album won ARIA Award for Best World Music Album.

Telek recorded his second studio album Serious Tam in 2000 at Peter Gabriel's Real World Studios in England. The album was released in July 2000. Malek toured the album across Europe, Australia, United Kingdom and the United States of America. The Times voted the album as 'Best Pop Album of 2000.

In December 2000, Telek was awarded an MBE for services to Papua New Guinea music.

2003-2011: Amette, Matogo & Akave
In March 2003, Talek recorded his third studio album, again with David Bridie as producer. The album sees a slight departure from his previous two efforts focusing on the more acoustic side of Telek's writing, featuring a mix of string band, Pacific roots pop and traditional Tolais songs. Amette was released in October 2004.

In 2006, Telek's three studio album were repackaged and rereleased to coincide with an Australian tour with his band The Moab Stringband. This tour featured a range of the Melanesian artists including Not Drowning, Waving, Tony Subam, Pius Wasi, Albert David, Djakapurra, Frank Yamma and Airi Ingram.

Whilst in Australia for Sing Sing 2006, The Moab Stringband spent two weeks in David Bridie's studios and recorded the album Matogo. The album comprises 12 stringband tunes as is the first international stringband album to be recorded. The album was released in 2007.

Akave, released in 2010 was described by Limelight Magazine as "balancing respect for traditional village music with just enough technology to satisfy contemporary sensibilities" and as "The pop album of the year" by The Sunday Times UK.

2012-present: A Bit na Ta & Cancer 
In 2016, Talek again joined with David Bridie for the project A Bit na Ta (Source of the Sea); a multimedia installation based on the lives of the Tolai people. An album of the same name was released. The album was nominated for Best Global/Reggae Act at the 2017 Victorian Music Awards.

In 2018, Telek was diagnosed with mouth cancer. The cancer was successfully removed by a surgeon in Brisbane, and Telek's voice was not affected. He was quoted as saying "I'm okay because they took the tumour from my lips. It didn't go into my mouth, it was just on the outside".

Discography

Albums

Awards

ARIA Music Awards
The ARIA Music Awards is an annual awards ceremony that recognises excellence, innovation, and achievement across all genres of Australian music. George Talek has won 1 award from 5 nominations.

|-
| 1992
| Tabaran 
| Best Indigenous Release
| 
|-
| rowspan="2"| 1997
| rowspan="2"| Telek
| Best Indigenous Release
| 
|-
| Best World Album
| 
|-
| 2001
| Serious Tam 
| Best World Album
| 
|-

Music Victoria Awards
The Music Victoria Awards are an annual awards night celebrating Victorian music. They commenced in 2006.

! 
|-
| 2017
| A Bit Na Ta (with David Bridie & Musicians of the Gunantuna)
| Best Global or Reggae Album
| 
| 
|-

References

External links 

1959 births
Living people
ARIA Award winners
Members of the Order of the British Empire
Papua New Guinean musicians
Real World Records artists
Papua New Guinean singers
People from East New Britain Province